Parrot and Olivier in America is a novel by Australian writer Peter Carey. It was on the shortlist of six books for the 2010 Man Booker Prize. It was also a finalist for the 2010 National Book Award.

The book, according to its publisher, is "an improvisation on the life of Alexis de Tocqueville", and focuses on Tocqueville's trips to the United States. The novel mimic's this life with the fictional character, Olivier de Garmont, to the life of Tocqueville, to help the reader explore Tocqueville's life. The titular "Parrot" is Garmont's secretary, which New York Times reviewer Thomas Mallon describes as "Dickensian" character, and a guardian of Garmont as they explore the American environment.

While Carey was developing the novel, an extract was published as:

Plot 
As the novel opens, Olivier recalls his childhood. Born to members of the French aristocracy, Olivier grows up a strange, unhealthy, and eternally curious boy. Meanwhile, Parrot grows up in working-class England, where his father works for a printer, and Parrot spends his days taking care of Watkins, an elderly engraver and counterfeiter.

Critical reception 
New York Times reviewer Thomas Mallon did not think the novel as a whole was very successful, though the style followed the quality of Carey's other working describing the novel as "replete with expressed feeling, if too wittily contrived for actual passion" and describes the novel as well written with each sentence "matchlessly robust".

References

Further reading 

2009 Australian novels
Novels by Peter Carey (novelist)
Hamish Hamilton books